This is a list of Canadian television related events from 1985.

Events

Debuts

Ending this year

Television shows

1950s
Country Canada (1954–2007)
Hockey Night in Canada (1952–present)
The National (1954–present)
Front Page Challenge (1957–1995)
Wayne and Shuster Show (1958–1989)

1960s
CTV National News (1961–present)
Land and Sea (1964–present)
Man Alive (1967–2000)
Mr. Dressup (1967–1996)
The Nature of Things (1960–present, scientific documentary series)
Question Period (1967–present, news program)
The Tommy Hunter Show (1965–1992)
W-FIVE (1966–present, newsmagazine program)

1970s
The Beachcombers (1972–1990)
Canada AM (1972–present, news program)
City Lights (1973–1989)
Definition (1974–1989)
the fifth estate (1975–present, newsmagazine program)
Live It Up! (1978–1990)
Marketplace (1972–present, newsmagazine program)
You Can't Do That on Television (1979–1990)
100 Huntley Street (1977–present, religious program)

1980s
Bumper Stumpers (1987–1990)
Danger Bay (1984–1990)
The Edison Twins (1982–1986)
Fraggle Rock (1983–1987)
Guess What (1983–1987)
Hangin' In (1981–1987)
The Journal (1982–1992)
Lorne Greene's New Wilderness (1982–1987)
Seeing Things (1981–1987)
Switchback (1981–1990)
Today's Special (1982–1987)
Thrill of a Lifetime (1981–1987)
Video Hits (1984–1993)

TV movies
The Boy Next Door
Charlie Grant's War
The Exile
The Front Line
Tools of the Devil
Where the Heart Is

See also
 1985 in Canada
 List of Canadian films of 1985